Heggholmen Lighthouse is a coastal lighthouse located in the Oslofjord, in the municipality of Oslo, Norway. It was established in 1827, and automated in 1972. The lighthouse was listed as a protected site in 1998.

See also

Lighthouses in Norway
List of lighthouses in Norway

References

External links
 
 Norsk Fyrhistorisk Forening 

Lighthouses completed in 1827
Lighthouses in Oslo
Listed lighthouses in Norway
1827 establishments in Norway